Coral Rock is an album by jazz saxophonist Archie Shepp recorded in Europe in 1970 for the America label at the same sessions which produced Pitchin Can. The album was also issued by the Prestige label in 1973.

Reception
The Allmusic review by Brandon Burke states "Coral Rock features an absolutely monster free jazz lineup... This is free jazz straight out of the late-'60s/early-'70s Paris scene. Very serious stuff".

Track listing 
 "Coral Rock" (Alan Shorter) – 21:35
 "I Should Care" (Sammy Cahn, Axel Stordahl, Paul Weston) – 14:05
 Recorded in Paris, France, July 23, 1970

Personnel 
 Archie Shepp - tenor saxophone, piano, soprano saxophone
 Clifford Thornton - trumpet, valve trombone
 Lester Bowie - trumpet
 Alan Shorter - flugelhorn
 Bobby Few - piano
 Bob Reid: bass
 Muhammad Ali - drums
 Djibrill - congas
 Ostaine Blue Warner - percussion

References 

1973 albums
Archie Shepp albums
Prestige Records albums